The title of sports director can refer to the director of a live sports broadcast. It can also refer to an individual at a television or radio station who is in charge of the sports department.

Director